Faltu or FALTU means "Useless".

Faltu may also refer to:

 Faltu, a 2006 Indian  Bengali-language film
 F.A.L.T.U, a 2011 Indian Hindi-language film
 Faltu (TV series), a 2022 Indian television series